CA. Amarjit Chopra is an Indian Chartered Accountant. He was the president of Institute of Chartered Accountants of India (ICAI) during 2010–11 period.

References

External links
 
 
 Video interview with Amarjith Chopra  on Moneycontrol.com
 President's Message - March 2010

Indian accountants
Living people
Year of birth missing (living people)